The Greco-Persian Wars were a series of wars between Ancient Greece and the Achaemenid Persian Empire.

Persian Wars may also refer to:
Roman–Persian Wars, a prolonged military conflict between Ancient Rome and the Parthian Persian Empire & the Sassanid Persian Empire
Muslim conquest of Persia, a war between the Sassanid Persian Empire and the Rashidun Caliphate
Russo-Persian Wars, a series of wars between Russian Empire and Persian Empire between the 17th and 19th centuries
Persian Wars (video game), a 2001 video game by Cryo Interactive Entertainment

See also
 Persian War (disambiguation)
 Iraq war (disambiguation)
 Military history of Iran